= Samarium pentaphosphide =

Identifiers
CAS Number	54466-01-2
3D model (JSmol)	Interactive image
- InChI: InChI=1S/5P.Sm Key: BOIVIBBFKRHHPN-UHFFFAOYSA-N
- SMILES: [Sm].[P].[P].[P].[P].[P]

Properties
Chemical formula	P_{5}Sm
Molar mass	305.23 g·mol^{−1}
Appearance	crystals
Density	3.99 g/cm^{3}
- Except where otherwise noted, data are given for materials in their standard state (at 25 °C [77 °F], 100 kPa). Infobox references

Samarium pentaphosphide is a binary inorganic compound of samarium metal and phosphorus with the chemical formula SmP_{5}.

== Preparation ==
Samarium pentaphosphide can be prepared by heating stoichiometric amounts of samarium and phosphorus at 700 °C:

4 Sm + 5 P_{4} → 4 SmP_{5}

== Properties ==
Samarium pentaphosphide forms crystals of monoclinic crystal system, spatial group P12_{1}/m1 or P2_{1}. It decomposes at 700 °C.
